The 1987 Big South Conference men's basketball tournament took place February 26–28, 1987, at the Savannah Civic Center in Savannah, Georgia. For the second time in their school history, the Baptist College Buccaneers (now known as Charleston Southern) won the tournament, led by head coach Tommy Gaither.

Format
All of the conference's eight members participated in the tournament, hosted at the Savannah Civic Center. Teams were seeded by conference winning percentage.

Bracket

* Asterisk indicates overtime game
Source

All-Tournament Team
Ben Hinson, Charleston Southern
Oliver Johnson, Charleston Southern
Heder Ambroise, Charleston Southern
Clarence Grier, Campbell
Henry Wilson, Campbell
Van Wilkins, UNC Asheville

References

Tournament
Big South Conference men's basketball tournament
Big South Conference men's basketball tournament
Big South Conference men's basketball tournament